El baisano Jalil is a 1942 Mexican film. It stars Sara García. Story about Lebanese-immigrants to Mexico in the earlier 19th century.

External links
 

1942 films
1940s Spanish-language films
Mexican black-and-white films
Mexican comedy-drama films
1942 comedy-drama films
1940s Mexican films